Andrzej Józef Gałażewski (born 20 April 1944) is a Polish politician. He was elected to the Sejm on 25 September 2005, getting 9524 votes in 29 Gliwice district as a candidate from the Civic Platform list.

He was also a member of Sejm 2001-2005.

See also
Members of Polish Sejm 2005-2007

External links
Andrzej Gałażewski - parliamentary page - includes declarations of interest, voting record, and transcripts of speeches.

1944 births
Living people
Civic Platform politicians
Civic Platform MEPs
MEPs for Poland 2004
Members of the Polish Sejm 2005–2007
Members of the Polish Sejm 2001–2005
Members of the Polish Sejm 2007–2011
Members of the Polish Sejm 2011–2015